Li Min (born 20 February 1976 in Wuhan, Hubei, China ) is a Chinese former synchronized swimmer who competed in the 1996 Summer Olympics and in the 2000 Summer Olympics.

References

1976 births
Living people
Chinese synchronized swimmers
Olympic synchronized swimmers of China
Synchronized swimmers at the 1996 Summer Olympics
Synchronized swimmers at the 2000 Summer Olympics
Asian Games medalists in artistic swimming
Artistic swimmers at the 1994 Asian Games
Artistic swimmers at the 1998 Asian Games
Swimmers from Wuhan
Synchronized swimmers from Hubei
Asian Games silver medalists for China
Asian Games bronze medalists for China
Medalists at the 1994 Asian Games
Medalists at the 1998 Asian Games